

List of representatives
Kingo Machimura (Liberal Democratic Party, 1952, 1953, 1955, 1958)
Setsuo Yokomichi, Socialist Party、1952・1953・1955・1958・1959・1960・1963・1967
Torazō Shimamoto, Socialist Party、1960・1967・1969・1972・1976
Usaburō Chisaki III, Liberal Democratic Party, 1963・1967・1969・1972・1976・1979・1980
Takahiro Yokomichi (Social Democratic Party, 1969-1983)
Nobutaka Machimura (Liberal Democratic Party, 1983-1996)

Election results
1993 Japanese general election
Nobutaka  Machimura, Liberal Democratic Party, 186,192 votes
Komeito, 171,089 votes
Social Democratic Party, 160,619 votes
Japanese Communist Party, 125,643 votes
independent, 14,149 votes
1990 Japanese general election
Nobutaka Machimura, Liberal Democratic Party, 155,142 votes
Japanese Communist Party, 153,527 votes
Komeito, 146,626 votes
independent, 24,967 votes
1986 Japanese general election
Nobutaka Machimura, Liberal Democratic Party, 165,041 votes
Social Democratic Party, 161,293 votes
Komeito, 149,036 votes
Japanese Communist Party, 132,789 votes
1983 Japanese general election
Nobutaka Machimura, Liberal Democratic Party, 171,814 votes
Komeito, 150,502 votes
Social Democratic Party, 140,623 votes
Japanese Communist Party, 109,206 votes
1980 Japanese general election
Takahiro Yokomichi, Social Democratic Party, 152,850 votes
1979 Japanese general election
Takahiro Yokomichi, Social Democratic Party, 172,598 votes
1976 Japanese general election
Takahiro Yokomichi, Social Democratic Party, 146,400 votes
Torazo Shimamoto, 129,889 votes
1972 Japanese general election
Torazo Shimamoto, 142,641 votes
Japanese Communist Party, 119,946 votes
Takahiro Yokomichi, Social Democratic Party, 111,244 votes
Komeito, 85,978 votes
1969 Japanese general election
Takahiro Yokomichi, Social Democratic Party, 98,829 votes
Torazo Shimamoto, 61,271 votes
Japanese Communist Party, 46,867 votes
1967 Japanese general election
Setsuo Yokomichi, 100,563 votes
Torazo Shimamoto, 95,701 votes
Liberal Democratic Party, 80,269 votes
Komeito, 76,176 votes
Japanese Communist Party, 22,281 votes
1963 Japanese general election
Liberal Democratic Party, 93,915 votes
Setsuo Yokomichi, 91,817 votes
Torazo Shimamoto, 63,079 votes
Japanese Communist Party, 10,640 votes
1960 Japanese general election
Setsuo Yokomichi, 83,138 votes
Liberal Democratic Party, 72,521 votes
Torazo Shimamoto, 53,422 votes
independent, 50,893 votes
Japanese Communist Party, 6,274 votes
1958 Japanese general election
Setsuo Yokomichi, 90,624 votes
Kingo Machimura, Liberal Democratic Party, 82,480 votes
Liberal Democratic Party, 65,230 votes
Japanese Communist Party, 9,731 votes
independent, 7,850 votes
1955 Japanese general election
Setsuo Yokomichi, 75,389 votes
Kingo Machimura, independent, 50,963 votes
Japanese Communist Party, 9,432 votes
independent, 4,109 votes
1953 Japanese general election
Setsuo Yokomichi, 48,513 votes
Kingo Machimura, 37,573 votes
Japanese Communist Party, 9,538 votes
1952 Japanese general election
Setsuo Yokomichi, 48,826 votes
Kingo Machimura, 42,815 votes
Japanese Communist Party, 10,023 votes
1949 Japanese general election
Japanese Communist Party, 14,388 votes
independent, 11,066 votes
1947 Japanese general election
independent, 12,030 votes
Japanese Communist Party, 4,821 votes

Politics of Hokkaido
History of Hokkaido
Districts of the House of Representatives (Japan)